It's Academic is an Australian children's game show which is based on the long-running American version of It's Academic, and pits students from different schools against each other in a test of knowledge covering a number of diverse subjects including English, mathematics, science, geography, sport, music and popular culture.

History 
The show originally aired on Network Ten from 1968 and 1969 being hosted by John Bailey and then on the Seven Network from 1970 to 1978. In the years 2001 to 2004, Seven Perth revived the show, where it was broadcast locally, leading to a national relaunch on 17 October 2005. The last version on 7TWO featured schoolchildren in Grade 6, aged around 11 to 12 years old.

The early incarnation of It's Academic was the basis for a series of sketches from The Late Show in which Santo Cilauro, Rob Sitch and Tom Gleisner, who all claimed to have gone to the same school, competed on the program with incredible but humorous incompetence. Coincidentally, their sometime collaborator actor/comedian Magda Szubanski had actually captained a team as a Year 10 student at Siena College in Melbourne, in 1976.

Hosts in the 1970s included Danny Webb (HSV-7),Trevor Sutton (Television Host) BTQ-7 Andrew Harwood (ATN-7 and HSV-7), Sandy Roberts (ADS-7), Alec McAskill (ADS-7), Jeff Newman (TVW-7) and John Bailey. In recent years, Jeff Newman once again hosted Perth's version of It's Academic while Simon Reeve fronts the national version.

Format

Original format 

The 1960s–70s version of It's Academic was conducted on a per-state basis, with episodes featuring on-air contestants in teams of three, with an official fourth as a reserve, each from one of three different high schools from that state. Contestants were aged around 15 or 16 years, in Year Ten at High School. Winning teams would progress through to state semifinals and finals. In many years, state champion teams met in a national grand finals. Shows were recorded with large live audiences on Saturdays with school staff representatives supervising the contest.

In early rounds, team captains would 'pick a packet' (a numbered pack of ten questions) from a board of numbered options. Teams could answer these questions with no penalties for incorrect answers, but each round was time-limited, and teams could pass on difficult questions to attempt remaining questions before returning to passed questions. All team members could respond to questions; in cases where two answers were given at the same time, the host would ask the captain to confirm the team's response. A 'beat the buzzer' segment and later a video-clip round completed the contest. In 'beat the buzzer', penalties applied for incorrectly answered questions. In cases of ties, captains would pick tie-breaker packets for their team to answer.

State contestants usually received Sheaffer or Parker pen sets as mementos, with additional prizes (often dictionaries or encyclopedias) awarded to the winning school. In the original series, cash prizes of A$500 ($2,732 to $6,505 in 2022 terms) to each team member were awarded to the state team final winners. National prizes differed but were of a similar financial value. In 1971, the national championship team was flown to Los Angeles and toured Hollywood.

The pilot and first two years of the Australian series were recorded by Network Ten, on Saturdays, at the North Ryde TEN10 studios in Sydney NSW and also in Victoria. The first two NSW seasons 1968 and 1969 were hosted by John Bailey, and both series finals were won by Marist Brothers, Eastwood. The show moved to the Seven Network in 1970 and was recorded at the ATN 7 Mobbs Lane studios at Epping, New South Wales, with a new host, Andrew Harwood. Marist Brothers Eastwood again made it to the 1970 series final but were defeated on that occasion.

In 1970, an "Its Academic Challenge" series, being an interstate contest involving all of the three teams from each state that competed in that state's championship round, was also recorded. In 1971, a team from Inala State High School in Queensland won the It's Academic Challenge final.

Revived format 
The 2008 version features six new schools every week, with the winning schools to reappear later in the season for semifinals and grand finals. Each individual episode features five teams (green, red, blue, yellow and purple), each made up of six members from each school. There is a new feature called the Clean Sweep; it only occurs when a team answers all questions correctly in the first round. A correct answer following the Clean Sweep will award the team with 20 points.

The question rounds consist of a series of five, aimed at one team only. Players are given five seconds to answer, or longer for a spelling question, and may confer amongst themselves before giving an answer. As in the original series, if two students answer differently at once, the team captain is asked to select one answer.

The Random Spotlight selects a member of the team at random. They are then asked a question about their chosen topic, which can be absolutely anything, ranging from academic subjects such as spelling or history, to more specific topics such as capital cities or outer space, to pop culture–themed topics.

Unlike the question rounds, Beat the Buzzer is open for all teams to answer. Simon Reeve reads out questions to all contestants, who buzz in to answer. This is the most competitive segment of the show, as teams attempt to buzz in before other teams in order to score points (10 per correct question; 10 per incorrect answer). Beat the Buzzer is a speed round lasting for 45 seconds. If the team answers a question after time is up, the team would not gain or lose 10 points regardless if it's right or wrong.

The information segment was introduced in Season 2. It consists of Lizzy Lovette and later Sally Stanton giving a brief report on a particular topic. Teams are asked a 10-point buzz-in question on the topic to make sure they were listening. Initially the team who correctly answered the question also won the right to be the first team to get their question round, but this was later dropped. No points are lost if a team answers the question incorrectly, but they would be locked out in the next question. Should this happen, another question would be asked by Reeve for the remaining teams.

In Watch This Space, contestants are shown a one-minute video clip on a certain subject, about which they are then asked three to five questions. All teams compete on the buzzer for the right to answer the questions: 10 points for a correct answer, 10 points off for a wrong answer. In later seasons, after each question, a screenshot from the video clip is shown to the audience that answers the question.

In Unscramble this Picture Puzzle, a 3-by-3 or a 4-by-4 sliding puzzle is shown on the screens; later, it became a 5-by-5 sliding puzzle. The puzzle can be a person, a place or an object. When a team buzzes in, the puzzle freezes. The first team to identify the puzzle gets 10 points for their team and the puzzle is instantly revealed to the audience. If they get it wrong, no points are deducted; however, they get locked out, allowing the other teams to answer it. If all three teams fail to identify the puzzle (scrambled or not), no points are given out and the answer is revealed.

The team who answers the Unscramble this Picture Puzzle question on the buzzer has the right to choose one of three topics for Fact or Fiction, a new round in 2006, and get five seconds to make that decision. Reeve then reads five statements about the topic for which schools buzz in to answer. These questions are simply true-or-false questions.

Scoring
Each team begins with 100 points. (When the show first returned in 2005, it was impossible to lose points at any time during the show; this made these 100 points rather useless.)
In the individual team question rounds, 10 points are awarded for a correct answer; no points are deducted for a wrong answer.
If a contestant correctly answers his or her Random Spotlight question, 20 points are awarded instead of 10; once again, no points are deducted for a wrong answer.
In any buzzer rounds, 10 points are awarded for a correct answer, and 10 points are deducted for a wrong answer. When the show was introduced in 2005, no penalties were given for incorrect answers.
The school with the most aggregate points at the end of the week is the winner, progressing to the semifinals and then the grand final. The winning school on any one day does not compete for more points or prizes, and should there be a tie it need not be broken. However, should there be a tie after the week, a tie-breaker would be given out for the Friday's teams. The team that gives the correct answer gets 10 points for their team and goes through to the next round. An incorrect answer would lose them 10 points, and the opposing team goes through instead.

Episodes
The following is an incomplete list of episodes broadcast, participating schools and winning schools from the show. At the end of each season, winning schools from prior episodes are invited back to play in the finals.

Season 1 (2005–06)

Season 2 (2006)

Season 3 (2006)

Season 4 (2007)

Season 5 (2007)

Season 6 (2008)

Season 7 (2008)

Season 8 (2009)

Season 9 (2009)

Season 10 (Summer Series) (2009)

Season 11 (2010)

Season 12 (2010)

Season 13 (2011)

Season 14 (2011)

Season 15 (2012)

Season 16 (2013)

Season 17 (2013–14)

Season 18 (2014)

Season 19 (2014–15)

Season 20 (2015–16)

Notes
Heat 3 of Season 2 ended in a tie. A student from Quakers Hill East Public answered correctly so they made it to the semi-finals.
Heat 5 of Season 3 ended in a tie. A student from Kings Langley answered incorrectly so Patrician made it to the semi-finals.
Heat 1 of Season 6 ended in a tie. A student from Rockdale Public answered correctly so they made it to the semi-finals.
Heat 5 of Season 6 ended in a tie. A student from Hazelbrook Public answered correctly so they made it to the semi-finals.
Heat 4 of Season 11 ended in a tie. A student from Burwood answered correctly so they made it to the semi-finals.
Heat 3 of Season 12 ended in a tie. Harring Street Public answered correctly to progress to the semi-finals.
Semi-Final 3 of Season 20 ended in a tie. A student from Pacific Hills Christian School answered incorrectly, so International Grammar School Ultimo progressed to the grand final.

See also
Australia's Brainiest Kid
The Weakest Link
Million Dollar Minute
List of Australian television series

References

External links
It's Academic on 7plus
It's Academic at the National Film and Sound Archive

Network 10 original programming
Seven Network original programming
7two original programming
Australian children's television series
Black-and-white Australian television shows
Student quiz television series
1968 Australian television series debuts
1960s Australian game shows
1970s Australian game shows
1978 Australian television series endings
2001 Australian television series debuts
2004 Australian television series endings
2005 Australian television series debuts
2016 Australian television series endings
2000s Australian game shows
2010s Australian game shows
English-language television shows
Australian television series based on American television series
Australian television series revived after cancellation
Television shows set in Sydney